Robert Wild may refer to:

Robert Wild (poet) (1615–1679), of the seventeenth century
Robert A. Wild (born 1940), president of Marquette University